The music of the video game Final Fantasy XII was composed primarily by Hitoshi Sakimoto. Additional music was provided by Masaharu Iwata and Hayato Matsuo, who also orchestrated the opening and ending themes. Former regular series composer Nobuo Uematsu's only work for this game was "Kiss Me Good-Bye", the theme song sung by Angela Aki. The Final Fantasy XII Original Soundtrack was released on four Compact Discs in 2006 by Aniplex. A sampling of tracks from the soundtrack was released as an album entitled Selections from Final Fantasy XII Original Soundtrack, and was released in 2006 by Tofu Records. Additionally, a promotional digital album titled The Best of Final Fantasy XII was released on the Japanese localization of iTunes for download only in 2006. "Kiss Me Good-Bye" was released by Epic Records as a single in 2006, and Symphonic Poem "Hope", the complete music from the game's end credits, was released by Hats Unlimited the same year. An abridged version of the latter piece, which originally accompanied a promotional video for the game, was included in the official soundtrack album. An album of piano arrangements, titled Piano Collections Final Fantasy XII, was released by Square Enix in 2012.

The soundtrack received mixed reviews from critics; while several felt that it was an excellent album, others disagreed, finding it to be a good soundtrack but lacking in substance. Common complaints about the album were the large number of filler tracks, which seemed to be uninspired and hurt the soundtrack as a whole. However, several reviewers commented on "Kiss Me Good-bye", finding it to be one of the soundtrack's strongest areas. The singles for the soundtrack were very well received by critics, who found them to be very enjoyable but short in duration, and the piano album was considered by reviewers to be one of the best in the series. The game's soundtrack was nominated for a British Academy of Film and Television Arts award for Best Original Score.

Creation and influence

Hitoshi Sakimoto composed most of the game's soundtrack; Nobuo Uematsu, following his departure from Square Enix in 2004, only contributed the theme song, "Kiss Me Good-Bye", sung by Angela Aki. Uematsu noted that Aki's style of playing the keyboard while singing reminded him of his childhood idol, Elton John, which was one of the reasons he chose her. Aki was approached for the role three years before the release of the game. She based her words for the song on "a scene of a new journey after good-bye", which was the sense she had gotten from Uematsu's melody, and was encouraged by Uematsu not to limit herself in her lyrics to what she thought the producers wanted. Sakimoto was brought in to compose the soundtrack to the game by Yasumi Matsuno, the producer of the game, five months before the game was officially announced. Sakimoto experienced difficulty following in Uematsu's footsteps, but he decided to create a unique soundtrack in his own way, although he cites Uematsu as his biggest musical influence.

Sakimoto did not meet with Uematsu for direction on creating the soundtrack and tried to avoid copying Uematsu's style from previous Final Fantasy soundtracks. However, he did attempt to ensure that his style would mesh with Uematsu's "Kiss Me Good-Bye" and the overall vision of the series. The soundtrack also includes pieces composed by Uematsu for previous Final Fantasy games, with new arrangements by Sakimoto. These tracks include "Final Fantasy ~FFXII Version~", "Victory Fanfare ~FFXII Version~", "Chocobo FFXII Arrange Ver. 1", "Chocobo ~FFXII Version~", and "Clash on the Big Bridge ~FFXII Version~". Of these, all but "Clash on the Big Bridge" are recurring pieces used in almost every Final Fantasy game. "Clash on the Big Bridge" plays during the battle with Gilgamesh, as it did in Final Fantasy V. Sakimoto created the music for the game based on the atmosphere of the game and the emotional changes of the characters, rather than the story, so that the music would not be affected by changes in the development of the game. Sakimoto stated in an interview included in a bonus disc of the collector's edition of the game that his favorite pieces from the soundtrack are the "world" themes in the outdoor areas, and that his overall favorite is "The Cerobi Steppe".

Soundtrack

Final Fantasy XII Original Soundtrack is the soundtrack album of Final Fantasy XII, containing musical tracks from the game, and was composed and produced by Hitoshi Sakimoto. Additional music was provided by Masaharu Iwata and Hayato Matsuo, who also orchestrated the opening and ending themes. The soundtrack spans four discs and 100 tracks, covering a duration of 4:54:34. It was released on May 31, 2006 in Japan by Aniplex, bearing the catalog numbers SVWC-7351~4. The limited edition of the soundtrack included a 28-page booklet featuring artwork for the game and providing information about the soundtrack.

An album entitled Selections from Final Fantasy XII Original Soundtrack was released on October 31, 2006 by Tofu Records containing 31 tracks from the full Final Fantasy XII soundtrack. The tracks were the same versions as on the full soundtrack, although some tracks that repeated were cut shorter. The album covers a duration of 73:23 and has a catalog number of TOF-033. Additionally, a promotional digital album titled The Best of Final Fantasy XII was released on the Japanese localization of iTunes for download only on March 15 the same year. The album contains 11 tracks handpicked by Hitoshi Sakimoto, including versions of "Theme of Final Fantasy XII" and "Chocobo FFXII Arrange Ver. 1" that were ultimately not used in the game.

The game's soundtrack was nominated for a British Academy of Film and Television Arts award for Best Original Score. Final Fantasy XII Original Soundtrack has sold 31,000 copies as of January 2010. It reached #7 on the Japanese Oricon charts, and stayed on the charts for six weeks. The album received mixed reviews from critics. Jared's review from Square Enix Music Online cited that the soundtrack "utilizes ambiance, power, intensity and beauty" and termed the album to be "amazing", though he felt that the lack of melody "hurts this soundtrack" and that some of the tracks were "bare of inspiration". Meghan Sullivan of IGN thought that the composer was "trying too hard to evoke emotion" and that many of the tracks were "over-the-top and bombastic", though she did feel that there were certain tracks that "manage[d] to be stirring". She also stated that Uematsu's only work for the soundtrack, "Kiss Me Good-bye", is a "strong end to a surprisingly trite collection". Greg Kasavin of GameSpot, on the other hand, felt that it was a "beautifully composed soundtrack" that sounded "fantastic". Patrick Gann of RPGFan found it to be "a great work", but "somewhat lacking in substance", concluding that he had "a lot of mixed feelings about it", while Ben Schweitzer of RPGFan disagreed, enjoying the soundtrack and finding it to be an "excellent" album, and "better than [he] could have expected".

Track list

Piano album
Piano Collections Final Fantasy XII is an album of piano arrangements of music from the game. The thirteen tracks on the album, totaling 1:01:48 in length, were composed by Sakimoto and arranged and performed by Casey Ormond. The album was released by Square Enix on November 7, 2012 with the catalog number SQEX-10347, and was also published that same day as part of Final Fantasy XII OST & Piano Collections, a pack containing the album and the original soundtrack album with the catalog numbers SQEX-10348~52. A book of sheet music for the album has also been released.

Sakimoto originally heard of Ormond due to an arrangement he had made of "The Skycity of Bhujerba" in 2009, which, after discussion between the two about several other arrangements Ormond made of Sakimoto's work, lead to the two officially working together on Valkyria Chronicles Piano Pieces, an album of piano arrangements for Valkyria Chronicles. The style of arrangements on the Final Fantasy XII album range from classical to a "moody piece with plenty of sultry jazz tones", one of the two pieces located at the end of the album which Ormond had arranged prior to officially beginning the project. Many of the pieces contain an "improvisational" sense, even when not technically jazz-based, and several depart notably from the style of the original works. Ormond based many of the changes in theme or mood of his arrangements off of where the pieces were used in the original game, attempting to highlight the perspectives of different characters or ideas from the scenes they were played in.

The album was well received by reviewers, with Don Kotowski of Square Enix Music Online calling it one of the best Final Fantasy piano arrangement albums, a claim echoed by Derek Heemsbergen of RPGFan. Heemsbergen added that "Ormond shows reverence for Sakimoto's original material while exploring musical ideas in a style all his own" and praised the variety of the music. Kotowski praised both the "variety of moods" covered by the pieces as well as the overall cohesiveness of the album.

The Zodiac Age
Corresponding with the release of a high-definition remaster of the International Zodiac Job System version of Final Fantasy XII, subtitled The Zodiac Age, Square Enix released an album of music from the game. The 102-track album, released digitally and physically on Blu-ray on July 19, 2017, contains new compositions and arrangements of the original tracks by Sakimoto. A limited edition of the album included an additional CD of just the arrangements. Tien Hoang of VGMOnline reviewed the album, and found it a "great update to a complex score"; they felt that the live instruments improved the score, though not as much as a full orchestra could have, and found the new tracks to be "fine but not groundbreaking".

Singles

Kiss Me Good-Bye

Kiss Me Good-Bye is the theme song of Final Fantasy XII, and is the third Japanese single by Angela Aki. The only vocal piece in the game, it was set to tunes composed by Nobuo Uematsu, arranged by Kenichiro Fukui and produced by Motoki Matsuoka. The single was released by Epic Records in Japan on March 15, 2006, covering a duration of 19:59 and bearing the catalog number ESCL-2810. A limited edition was also released bearing the catalog number ESCL-2808 featuring a DVD containing the Kiss Me Good-Bye video clip which included both shots of Aki performing the single and clips from the video game. Unlike previous Final Fantasy games, the theme song is sung in English in both the Japanese and North American versions of the game. The version featured on the CD single has a slightly different arrangement and Japanese lyrics; however, the English version that was featured in the game is included as a bonus track. An English version of the single was released as a digital single on May 16 the same year under the title Kiss Me Good-Bye [EP] in North America through Tofu Records.

"Kiss Me Good-bye" reached #6 on the Oricon charts and remained on the charts for 18 weeks. The release was seen by critics as an excellent single, with Gann feeling that both the Final Fantasy XII and non-game tracks held their weight equally.

Symphonic Poem "Hope"
 is a single released by violinist Taro Hakase and is the full version of the game's ending credits music. The piece has been described as a "mini-symphony" for Final Fantasy XII inspired by the main theme for the game. The single contains five tracks, arranged by Taro Hakase and Yuji Toriyama and produced by Taro Hakase, and features performance by the London Philharmonic Orchestra. A shorter edit blending the first, second and fifth movements of the symphonic poem was used in a promotional video for the game, and appears as a single track in the official soundtrack release. Symphonic Poem "Hope" was released on March 1, 2006 by Hats Unlimited bearing the catalog number HUCD-10015.

Hope was found by critics to be an enjoyable single, though at only 9 minutes long, Gann felt he could have "gotten by without it", although he said that for other listeners, their "collection may not be complete without this little gem". Dave of Square Enix Music Online concurred with that sentiment, saying that "despite the length of the album, it easily grew on" him. "Hope" reached #15 on the Oricon charts and remained on the charts for 16 weeks.

Legacy
"Kiss Me Good-bye" was performed by the Chicagoland Pops Orchestra and Angela Aki for Play! A Video Game Symphony, a worldwide video game music orchestral concert series. The Eminence Symphony Orchestra performed "Victory Fanfare", "Clan Headquarters", and "Penelo's Theme" at the three "Passion" concerts held in Australia and Singapore in December 2006. "Penelo's Theme" was again played at the Fantasy Comes Alive concert in Singapore on April 30, 2010. Selections of music from the game also appear on Japanese remix albums, called dojin music, and on English remixing websites.

References

External links
 Official Angela Aki Site
 
 Final Fantasy XII Original Soundtrack home page at Square Enix

Final Fantasy music
Music
Video game soundtracks
Video game music discographies